A high performance computing center is the name given to the location of several super computers around the world:

 High-Performance Computing Centre at the University of Calabria
 High Performance Computing Centre at the Swiss Institute of Bioinformatics
 High Performance Computing Center at Michigan State University
 High Performance Computing Center North (HPC2N) at the Umeå Institute of Technology
 High Performance Computing Center in Stuttgart, Germany at
 Massachusetts Green High Performance Computing Center
 Maui High Performance Computing Center (MHPCC)
 National High Performance Computing Center at Istanbul Technical University
 University of California High-Performance AstroComputing Center

Supercomputer sites